Ivan Anatoliyovych Len (born 25 July 1982) is a Ukrainian professional football player who played in FC Obolon Kyiv.

External links 

1982 births
Living people
FC Obolon-Brovar Kyiv players
FC Hoverla Uzhhorod players
Ukrainian footballers
Association football midfielders